State Route 279 (SR 279) is a  east–west state highway in Franklin County, Tennessee.

Route description

SR 279 begins as Spring Creek Road in Estill Springs at an intersection with US 41A/SR 16 (N Main Street) just north of downtown. It heads north through neighborhoods before making a sharp turn to the east, where it leaves Estill Springs and passes through rural farmland. The highway then becomes Morris Ferry Bridge Road, at an intersection with Beth Page Road, and passes through wooded areas to cross a bridge over the Elk River, just shortly before passing just south of the Elk River Dam. SR 279 winds its way northeast along the banks of the Woods Reservoir, where it passes by Franklin County Park, before coming to an end at an intersection with SR 127. The entire route of SR 279 is a two-lane highway.

Major intersections

References

279
Transportation in Franklin County, Tennessee